is an action role-playing game developed by Game Freak and published by Nintendo and The Pokémon Company for the Nintendo Switch. It is part of the eighth generation of the Pokémon video game series and serves as a prequel to Pokémon Diamond and Pearl (2006). The game was first announced as part of the Pokémon 25th Anniversary event in February 2021, and was released worldwide on January 28, 2022.

The game follows the protagonist, sent back through time, as they travel through the Hisui region based on the island of Hokkaido during early Japanese colonization. Centered around exploration of the region's several open areas populated with Pokémon, the game's objective is to complete a roster of the region's Pokémon, known as the Pokédex. Pokémon Legends: Arceus was a commercial success, having sold over 13.91 million copies by September 30, 2022. Pokemon Legends: Arceus was a critical success, receiving generally favourable reviews, and being nominated for several end of the year awards, including Best RPG at The Game Awards.

Gameplay
Pokémon Legends: Arceus is an action role-playing game that preserves the core gameplay of past entries in the mainline series. The player is able to roam freely across the game map, divided into five large areas of individual biomes. Each time the player enters such areas, they spawn in a camp, and can fast travel to other camps in the same area. Outside of traversing the landscape on foot, the player can unlock rideable Pokémon which can travel faster, swim across bodies of water, climb cliffs, or fly. In each area, Pokémon wander the landscape, being found in certain habitats and will interact with both the player and their environments. Some will actively avoid the player while others act aggressively, and some exhibit other specific behaviors. A number of "Alpha" Pokémon - larger, more powerful versions of the Pokémon - can also be found in the areas. The multiple areas and the hub system instead of a fully open world gameplay resulted in reviewers comparing Legends: Arceus with the Monster Hunter series. Reviewers also drew comparisons between Pokémon Legends: Arceus and The Legend of Zelda: Breath of the Wild, noting apparent similarities in both gameplay and art style.
Unlike in previous titles, the player character themselves can be attacked and harmed by wild Pokémon. If enough damage is taken, they will fall unconscious and reappear at the base camp. Players can capture wild Pokémon in the overworld without engaging in battle, though some must still be battled before being caught. Battles can be initiated by releasing captured Pokémon near a wild Pokémon. While the turn-based battle system of the prior titles is retained in the game, an additional feature is added which allows players to trade attack damage for more turns and vice versa. Outside standard battles, the game also introduces special boss battles where the player character has to dodge and attack powerful Pokémon, regular turn-based battles being included during the fights as opportunities to stun the bosses.

By battling, capturing, or engaging with other interactions with Pokémon, players obtain progress in completing their Pokédex entries. Players can also take on and complete side quests given by NPCs in the game. In total, the game featured 242 Pokémon on release, including 7 new species and 17 new iterations ("forms") of existing Pokémon. At the start of the game, three starter Pokémon are available: Rowlet (from Sun and Moon), Cyndaquil (from Gold and Silver) and Oshawott (from Black and White). Pokémon Legends: Arceus is the first mainline game to feature starter Pokémon from different regions together. While players can trade Pokémon online, Legends: Arceus does not feature multiplayer battles, unlike previous installments in the series.

Plot

Setting

The game is set in a bygone era of the Sinnoh region's history, when it was known as the Hisui region, long before the events of Pokémon Diamond and Pearl and their remakes take place. Hisui is based on the real-life island of Hokkaido during the Muromachi period, when it was still known as Ezo, with new settlers from other regions interacting with natives in a parallel with the interaction between Hokkaido's Ainu people and Japanese settlers. Ainu groups are represented in the game by the Diamond and Pearl clans, while new mainland settlers are represented by the Galaxy Expedition Team.

The vast majority of the region is covered in sparse, open wilderness populated with wild Pokémon, with only one significant settlement in addition to a number of small campsites. Unlike in the setting of previous Pokémon games, Pokémon are treated as wild animals or forces of nature instead of as companions or partners. Poké Balls in the game are made of "Apricorn" fruit and puff steam when a Pokémon is caught, instead of being presented as high-tech devices like in previous installations, while the Pokédex is a paper notebook.

Story
The game begins with the player speaking with a disembodied voice, identified as Arceus, the creator deity of the Pokémon-Universe, which tasks the player with encountering all Pokémon in the Hisui region before transporting the player there through a rift in spacetime. The player is found by Pokémon researcher Professor Laventon, who brings the player to a local settlement named Jubilife Village. There, the player is recruited into the Survey Corps of the Galaxy Expedition Team, a group that has arrived in Hisui to chart and study the region. After receiving their starter Pokémon, the player proceeds to travel the Hisui region to complete the Pokédex. Throughout the player's journey, the spacetime rift they had been transported through results in several powerful "Noble Pokémon" venerated by the local Diamond and Pearl clans turning berserk through powerful lightning, forcing the player to engage them in battles using 'balms' to calm them down.

After the player defeats five noble Pokémon, the spacetime rift begins to worsen rather than calm down as per the Galaxy Team's expectations and the sky turns an ominous red color. Blamed for the instability, the player (who came through the same rift) is banished from Jubilife Village by Commander Kamado, leader of the Galaxy Team, and forced to travel the region again to address the cause of the rift. Working with either the Diamond or Pearl clans and under the care of a folklore researcher called Cogita, the player travels to the three major lakes of the region to encounter the legendary Pokémon Azelf, Mesprit and Uxie, the three beings that embody willpower, emotion & knowledge respectively. Once the player passes their trials, the three provide materials to craft the Red Chain needed to stop the rift. After defeating Commander Kamado at the summit, the player reaches the peak of Mount Coronet: The Temple of Sinnoh, at the center of the region. Depending on the clan the player worked with, either Dialga (Diamond Clan) or Palkia (Pearl Clan) appears first, breaks the Red Chain, and is caught by the player before their enraged counterpart emerges. Using the fragments of the Red Chain, a special Poké Ball capable of capturing the other legendary Pokémon is crafted. The player battles the legendary Pokémon in its Origin Forme and captures it, sealing the spacetime rift.

In the post-game, the player teams up with Volo, a member of the Gingko Guild merchant group who assisted the player throughout the game, to seek out all of the Plates associated with Arceus. Through this journey, the player encounters a number of other legendary Pokémon, each one holding a Plate. Arriving at the Temple of Sinnoh for the last plate, Volo betrays the player and attempts to steal the Plates from the player to draw out Arceus and subjugate it to make a new world. Volo also reveals he allied himself with Giratina to open the spacetime rift in a failed attempt to drive out Arceus, sending the legendary caught at the end of the game mad. The player defeats both Volo and Giratina, securing the final Plate and transforming the player's Celestica Flute item into the Azure Flute. Once all other Pokémon (excluding Shaymin and Darkrai, which are only obtainable with save data from other games) have been captured, the player can play the Azure Flute at the Temple of Sinnoh to encounter Arceus. After the player proves themselves in battle, Arceus bestows upon them a part of itself, so that it may explore the world that it created by the player's side.

Development
Pokémon Legends: Arceus is the first known project by Game Freak in the action role-playing subgenre.

Marketing and release
Pokémon Legends: Arceus was first revealed in the Pokémon Presents on February 26, 2021 alongside Pokémon Brilliant Diamond and Shining Pearl as part of the Pokémon 25th Anniversary celebration. According to the official Pokémon Twitter account, it serves as a "premake" to Diamond and Pearl. During a Pokémon Presents on August 18, 2021, new trailer was revealed with a focus on exploration and story background, as well as new Pokémon. On September 28, 2021, a new trailer showcased some of the game's customization, menus, characters, and Kleavor, a new Pokémon. On October 19, 2021, an artificially corrupted "found footage" CGI video was showcased teasing new Pokémon. Two days later, it was confirmed that the obscured Pokémon were regional forms of Zorua and Zoroark. On December 9, 2021, the official Pokémon Twitter account teased a Poké Ball-related announcement for Legends: Arceus. The next day, a regional variant of Voltorb, a Pokémon based on Poké Balls, was announced. On December 15, 2021, a new trailer showcased several factions present in the game, as well as their leaders. On January 7, 2022, an overview trailer was released in Japanese, showcasing the world, people, and Pokémon. However, the trailer was not localized into English until January 24, 2022.

The game was released worldwide on January 28, 2022. Exclusive in-game and physical bonuses were given out to those who pre-ordered the game digitally or physically. In Japan, those who pre-ordered Pokémon Legends: Arceus received a gold holographic artbook along with a limited edition Arceus promotional trading card.

A free content update, Daybreak, was announced and released on February 27, 2022.

Tie-ins
Announced in April 2022, an ONA webseries tie-in, titled Pokémon: Hisuian Snow, debuted on YouTube and Pokémon TV on May 18, 2022.

A limited 4-episode ONA webseries tie-in, titled Pokémon: The Arceus Chronicles, debuted on Amazon Prime Video in Japan in January 2022 and debuted on Netflix on September 23, 2022.

Reception

Critical reception

Pokémon Legends: Arceus received "generally favorable reviews", according to review aggregator Metacritic. Andrew Webster of The Verge praised the game's overhaul of the Pokémon formula, particularly the world design and Pokédex challenges, writing that it was "the biggest overhaul to the Pokémon formula since the series debuted". Despite criticizing the battle system, Ryan Gilliam of Polygon liked the open world and how simple catching Pokémon was compared to previous entries, saying: "It's so easy and fluid to just grab a Pokémon and add them to my party while I'm exploring the game's verdant fields or snowy tundra".

Jordan Middler of Nintendo Life praised Pokémon Legends: Arceus for its "rewarding" exploration, "addictive" catching mechanics, quality of the Pokémon roster, and its "genuine sense of scale", while stating that "Pokémon Legends: Arceus is quite simply one of the greatest Pokémon games ever made". Jessica Scharnagle of Dot Esports stated that many of the tedious mechanics and forced activities in prior games were better simplified or removed to give the players more freedom in gameplay, while criticizing the game's performance.

Chris Tapsell of Eurogamer enjoyed the new animations and art for the Pokémon in Arceus, saying "The way wild Pokémon, more vibrantly animated here than in any previous game, are all hops, rolls, lumbers. All splashes, naps, growls, and waddles. The way they exist so unelaborately but with so much personality is such a simple treat". Andrew Cunningham of Ars Technica disliked the graphical style and lack of new Pokémon, but felt the battle system and open world exploration mixed well together, saying: "And when the battle is over, you can go right back to exploring or catching other Pokémon, with no pauses for level-ups or learning moves [...] once you learn the ropes, it's easy to lose yourself in the rhythm of sneaking, catching, battling, and exploring". Tom Regan of The Guardian praised the exploration and the changes in gameplay compared to earlier entries in the franchise, saying: "For arguably the first time since the series began, everything feels fresh, and thrillingly unpredictable", but criticized the quality of the game's visuals, comparing it unfavorably to that of The Legend of Zelda: Breath of the Wild and Xenoblade Chronicles 2.

Pokemon Legends: Arceus was nominated for several end of the year awards; it was nominated for Best RPG at The Game Awards, as well as nominated for Game of the Year by GamesRadar, GamingBolt, The Washington Post, Empire, VGC, GamesHub, and Polygon.

Sales
As of September 30, 2022, the game has sold 13.91 million copies. Nintendo reported that the game sold 6.5 million copies worldwide within a week of release, outpacing other Nintendo Switch Pokémon titles such as Sword and Shield and Brilliant Diamond and Shining Pearl.

In Japan, it sold  physical copies within three days, and another 645,000 throughout February to top sales charts in both months. It sold 125,851 units in March, making it the second best-selling game of the month (below Kirby and the Forgotten Land).

In the United States, Legends: Arceus (excluding digital downloads) was the best-selling video game in January 2022. It was the second best-selling game the following month and sixth in March, making it the second best-selling game during the first quarter of 2022 (second only to Elden Ring).

Accolades

Notes

References

External links
 (US)
 

2022 video games
Action role-playing video games
Game Freak games
Golden Joystick Award winners
Japan Game Award winners
Nintendo Switch games
Nintendo Switch-only games
Legends: Arceus
Single-player video games
Video game prequels
Video games developed in Japan
Video games featuring protagonists of selectable gender
Video games about time travel